There are several lakes named Mud Lake in the U.S. state of Arizona:
 Mud Lake, Coconino County, Arizona. 
 Mud Lake, Coconino County, Arizona. 
 Mud Lake, Coconino County, Arizona.

References
 USGS – U.S. Board on Geographic Names

Lakes of Coconino County, Arizona
Lakes of Arizona